Beyond Rangoon is an original soundtrack album written by the German composer Hans Zimmer. The film Beyond Rangoon and the album were released in 1995. It features the nature of the Burmese background during and after the 8888 Uprising in Burma. Hans Zimmer highlights on South-East Asia tradition where he employs pipes, wood flutes, and native rhythms with vivid effects to demonstrate the character of the students' strike in 1988, Burma and their fleeing Rangoon after martial law imposed.

Soundtrack titles

References

External links 
Buy Beyond Rangoon
Hans Zimmer website

Hans Zimmer soundtracks
Milan Records soundtracks
RCA Records soundtracks
1995 soundtrack albums
1990s film soundtrack albums